Janakpur Road railway station is a small railway station in Sitamarhi district, Bihar. Its code is JNR. It serves Janakpur Road town. The station consists of 2 platforms. It's B category railway station of Samastipur railway division.

The Janakpur Road is well connected to most of the major cities in India like Patna, Delhi, Mumbai, Kolkata, Guwahati, Lucknow, and other cities by the railway network.

Trains

 New Jalpaiguri–Sitamarhi Weekly Express
 Kolkata–Sitamarhi Express
 Mithilanchal Express
 Raxaul–Lokmanya Tilak Terminus Karmabhoomi Express
 Howrah–Raxaul Express
 Lichchavi Express
 Sadbhavna Express (via Sitamarhi)
 Sadbhavna Express (via Faizabad)
 Kamakhya–Shri Mata Vaishno Devi Katra Express
 Samastipur–Muzaffarpur DEMU
 Samastipur–Raxaul DEMU
 Darbhanga–Raxaul DEMU
 Raxaul– Sitamarhi DEMU
 Darbhanga–Muzaffarpur DEMU

References

Railway stations in Sitamarhi district
Samastipur railway division